Ghassan Ramlawi (born 3 July 1993), known professionally as Zuna, is a German rapper of Lebanese descent.

Biography 
He was born in the Lebanese city Baalbek and has three siblings. In 2001, when he was seven years old, he immigrated to Germany with his single mother and siblings. They lived in Munich and later moved to Switzerland where they deported back to Lebanon, when Zuna was 15 years old. In the same year, his family moved again to Germany. Since then, they have lived in Dresden. Three years later, he and his family received asylum. Since 2010, he is part of the rap group KMN Gang.

Discography

Albums

EPs

Singles

As lead artist

As featured artist

Other charted songs

References

External links 

German rappers
1993 births
Living people
People from Dresden
German people of Lebanese descent